Daniel Alberto Blanco (born July 30, 1978) is an Argentine retired footballer who played as a centre back and football coach.

Honours

Club
F91 Dudelange
Luxembourg National Division (1): 2008-09

External links
Daniel Blanco Official at Danielblanco

1978 births
Living people
Argentine footballers
Ethnikos Achna FC players
F91 Dudelange players
Alki Larnaca FC players
Ermis Aradippou FC players
Daniel Blanco
ASIL Lysi players
Cypriot First Division players
Cypriot Second Division players
Daniel Blanco
Argentine expatriate footballers
Argentine expatriate sportspeople in Bolivia
Argentine expatriate sportspeople in Chile
Argentine expatriate sportspeople in Cyprus
Argentine expatriate sportspeople in Italy
Argentine expatriate sportspeople in Thailand
Expatriate footballers in Bolivia
Expatriate footballers in Chile
Expatriate footballers in Cyprus
Expatriate footballers in Italy
Expatriate footballers in Thailand
Association football defenders
Pol. Alghero players
Daniel Blanco
Daniel Blanco
Argentine football managers
Footballers from Córdoba, Argentina